Samuel Landauer (22 February 1846 at Hürben, Bavaria – 1937 in Augsburg) was a German Jewish orientalist and librarian.

He received his education at the Yeshiva of Eisenstadt (Hungary), the gymnasium of Mainz, and the universities of Leipzig, Strasbourg, and Munich (Ph.D. 1872). In 1875, he became privatdozent of Semitic languages at the University of Strasbourg, and was appointed librarian there in 1884. In 1894, he received the title of Professor.

Landauer published:

"Psychologie des Ibn Sinâ," 1872
"Sa'adja's Kitâb al-Amânât," Leyden, 1880
"Katalog der Kaiserlichen Universität- und Landesbibliothek Strasburg, Orientalische Handschriften," 1881
"Firdusi Schahname," Leyden, 1884
"Die Handschriften der Grossherzoglich Badischen Hof- und Landesbibliothek in Karlsruhe, Orientalische Handschriften," 1892
"Die Masorah zum Onkelos," Amsterdam, 1896
"Themistius 'De cælo'" (for the Aristoteles Commission of the Berlin Academy), Berlin, 1902.

External links
 Source

German orientalists
Jewish orientalists
German librarians
19th-century German Jews
People from Günzburg (district)
German expatriates in Hungary
People from Eisenstadt
1846 births
1937 deaths
German male non-fiction writers
Oberlander Jews